Rufa Mae Ocampo Quinto-Magallanes (born May 28, 1978) is a Filipino actress, comedian, television host, model, endorser, stylist and film producer. She is recognised as the country's “Comedy Princess” for her wit, humor, and energy that made her one of the pillars of Philippine entertainment.

Quinto is a ten-time Best Comedy Actress winner at the PMPC Star Awards for Television, setting the record with more wins than any other artist in the category. She also earned a nomination at the prestigious FAMAS Awards in the 'Best Actress' category. The Philippine Star listed her as one of the "greatest comedians of all time", stating that "she is the best" among her contemporaries. In 2019, she was honored with an Award of Distinction by the Red & Black Gala Awards, recognizing her prowess as an actress and  performer as a whole. 

Quinto has made an undeniable mark on Philippine pop culture, with her unforgettable signature lines in some of her iconic films, such as the famous “Todo na ‘to!” and “Go! Go! Go!” In 2021, she graced the cover of US-based Showbiz Magazine, as part of a special issue. FHM Philippines listed Quinto as one of the Top 25 Sexiest Women of the Decade. Rufa  Mae has appeared four times on the cover of FHM Magazine, coincidentally becoming the fourth Filipino FHM cover girl.

Quinto is best known for her roles in  iconic, classic films (that are often referenced in popular culture), including  Booba, Super B, Ako Legal Wife: Mano Po 4, Pasukob and Temptation Island, to name a few.

Career

1994–1999: Beginnings and breakthrough
Quinto's show business career began in 1994, when she was offered a position by That's Entertainment. Her first film was Indecent Professor, starring Glydel Mercado, Amanda Page, and Michelle Parton. She then played supporting roles, until she got her first major role in the 1997 film “Gloria, Gloria Labandera”.

2000–2009: Rise to prominence and popularity
Quinto continues to reach new career heights at the turn of the new millennium. In 2001, her first big break was when she starred in a titular role in the blockbuster hit Booba, which remains one of her most popular films to date. Due to her screen popularity and voluptuous figure, she released her debut album Rated R that same year, which included the theme song of Booba. In 2003, she hosted the MTV Pilipinas Music Awards with Ogie Alcasid. In 2004, she landed another box-office hit Masikip sa Dibdib where she is credited as one of the producers of the film. The accompanying soundtrack of the film includes a song with Regine Velasquez doing the backing vocals. In 2005, she landed a Best Actress nomination at the prestigious FAMAS Awards for her performance in the film “Mano Po 4: Ako Legal Wife” where she competed with the likes of Claudine Barretto and Irma Adlawan. At this point of her career, she has already worked with the likes of Rudy Fernandez, Robin Padilla, Bong Revilla, Regine Velasquez and Ai-Ai de las Alas. In 2009, FHM Philippines listed her among the Top 25 sexiest women of the decade.

2010-2019: Established actress and continued success

With over 15 years of experience in the show business, Quinto has already established herself as a pop culture icon in the industry. In 2011, she starred in the sexy comedy film “Temptation Island” and was a box-office success. It earned a whooping ₱10 million in its first day, around ₱27.65 million in its first 5 days and has grossed ₱55.42 million within 2 weeks, becoming the 8th highest grossing domestic film of 2011. The next year, she tied with Pokwang on winning Best Comedy Actress at the 2012 PMPC Star Awards for her performance in the comedy show “Bubble Gang”.

2020-present: Hiatus & showbiz comeback

In 2020, Quinto and her family moved to the United States. After two years of hiatus from show business, she made a comeback and signed a management contract with Sparkle GMA Artist Center. She landed a major role in the GTV’s upcoming first family sitcom “Tols”. Not long after, she immediately made guest appearances on Mars Pa More and Family Feud. She will also do an episode for Tadhana with acclaimed actress Irma Adlawan.

Personal life
Quinto is the daughter of Alexander Quinto and Fe Ann "Carol" Ocampo, who separated when she was only one year old. She is the second cousin of Jean Garcia, who also came from That's Entertainment, and the second-degree aunt of Jennica Garcia.

On August 30, 2007, burglars broke into Quinto's house in an exclusive subdivision in Quezon City; she lost valuable property worth P2 million (a watch worth P1.2 million, a laptop, and valuables from inside her bag).

In 1999–2000, Quinto dated singer songwriter politician Dingdong Avanzado. She has also dated singer Erik Santos.

Quinto married financial analyst, Trevor Magallanes on November 25, 2016 in Quezon City. The two had met in 2016, during Quinto's fifth visit in the United States. She gave birth to their first daughter Athena on February 18, 2017. Quinto and her daughter splits their time between the Philippines and the United States, where her husband is based. As of September 2020, she and her daughter have applied for a U.S. green card.

Filmography

Film
Kalabog en Bosyo (1994)
Grepor Butch Belgica Story (1995)
Manalo, Matalo, Mahal Kita (1995)
Ang Pinakamagandang Hayop sa Balat ng Lupa (1996)
Dyesebel (1996)
April Boys: Sana Makapiling Muli Ako (1996)
Ang Tipo Kong Lalake, Maginoo Pero Medyo Bastos (1996)
Paracale Gang (1996)
Pipti Pipti (1996)
Pablik Enemi 1 n 2: Aksidental Heroes (1997)
Si Mokong, si Astig, at si Gamol (1997)
Gloria, Gloria Labandera (1997)
Papunta Ka Pa Lang, Babalik na Ako (1997)
Anak ni Boy Negro (1997)
Magkapalad (1997)
Habang Nasasaktan Lalong Tumatapang (1997)
Parak: The Bobby Barbers Story (1997)
Matinik na Bading, Mga Syukang Buking (1997)
Squala (1998)
Ang Erpat Kong Astig (1998)
Sumigaw Ka Hanggang Gusto Mo (1999)
Bayadra Brothers (1999)
Dahil May Isang Ikaw (1999)
Bullet (1999)
Asin at Paminta (1999)
Ako ang Lalagot sa Hininga Mo (1999)
Mana-mana Tiba-tiba (2000)
Kailangan Ko'y Ikaw (2000)
Booba (2001)
Baliktaran: Si Ace at si Daisy (2001)
Radyo (2001)
Pagdating ng Panahon (2001)
Mahal Kita, Final Answer (2002)
Super B (2002)
Hula Mo, Huli Ko (2002)
A.B. Normal College: Todo na 'yan, Kulang pa 'yun (2003)
Captain Barbell (2003)
Masikip sa Dibdib (2004)
La Visa Loca (2005)
D' Anothers (2005) (cameo role)
Ako Legal Wife: Mano Po 4?! (2005)
Oh, My Ghost! (2006)
Apat Dapat, Dapat Apat (2007)
Pasukob (2007)
Desperadas (2008)
Manay Po 2: Overload (2008)
I.T.A.L.Y. (2008)
Desperadas 2 (2008)
Status: Single (2009)
OMG (Oh, My Girl!) (2009)
Kimmy Dora (2009)
Wapakman (2009)
Si Agimat at si Enteng Kabisote (2010)
Temptation Island (2011)
Ang Huling Henya (2013)
Raketeros (2013)
My Big Bossing's Adventures (2014)
Mary, Marry Me (2018)
And Ai Thank You (2019)
Love Is Love (2019)
My Teacher (2022)

Television

Awards and nominations

See also
Rufa Mi

Notes

References

External links

Rufa Mae Quinto official site

1978 births
Living people
ABS-CBN personalities
Filipino film actresses
Filipino women comedians
Filipino expatriates in the United States
GMA Network personalities
Kapampangan people
People from Pampanga
That's Entertainment Monday Group Members
That's Entertainment (Philippine TV series)